Martyn Gilbert Croy (born 23 January 1974) is a former New Zealand cricketer who played for the Otago Volts in the State Championship and the State Shield. He was the deputy wicketkeeper to Adam Parore in the New Zealand national cricket team on their 1999 tour of England. He played in four first-class matches for the New Zealand side during the tour and had previously played under-19 Test and One Day International matches for the country, but did not play a senior international match for the side.

Croy was born at Hamilton in 1974. He worked as a sports administrator.

References

1974 births
Living people
New Zealand cricketers
Otago cricketers
South Island cricketers
Wicket-keepers